Lucius Pomponius (fl. c. 90 BC or earlier) was a Roman dramatist.  Called Bononiensis (“native of Bononia” (i.e. Bologna), Pomponius was a writer of Atellanae Fabulae (Atellan Fables), and a near contemporary of Quintus Novius.  Pomponius was the first to give artistic dignity to the Atellan Fables by making them less improvised and providing the actors with a script (written in the metrical forms and technical rules of the Greeks) and a predetermined plot.  Pomponius’ skill in the utilization of rustic, obscene, quotidian, alliterative, punning, and farcical language was remarked on by Macrobius in his Saturnalia, as well as by Seneca and Marcus Velleius Paterculus.  His work included political, religious, social, and mythological satires.

Surviving Titles and Fragments
Some of the titles of the seventy works attributed to him are:

Sources
Meyer, Maurice, “Études sur le théâtre latin”
Imago Mundi -Atellanes

Pomponius
Pomponius
Pomponius
1st-century BC Romans
1st-century BC writers